Prisoner's Dilemma is a 1988 novel by American author Richard Powers. It is the story of a dysfunctional family living in DeKalb County, Illinois. The novel explores the impact of history on contemporary life.

The novel centres on the father of the family, Eddie Hobson, who is trying to find a solution to the "prisoner's dilemma" posed by mathematicians at the RAND Corporation. He wishes to solve the dilemma through writing an alternate reality, explaining how human beings could live together peacefully. To do this, he uses many elements from real life twisted slightly.

Non-fiction portrayed in the novel
Many of these events are portrayed differently. For example, Disney is portrayed as having Japanese ancestry, when he did not.
 Americans of Japanese Ancestry and their internment during World War II.
 Century of Progress, the 1933 World Fair held in Chicago.
 Der Fuehrer's Face, animated cartoon made by Disney in 1942.
 Disney's Nine Old Men, chief animators at Disney.
 Walt Disney, American animator.
 Trinity test, the first testing of a nuclear weapon in 1945.
 Victory Through Air Power, part-animated propaganda movie made by Disney in 1943.

References

External links

1988 American novels
Novels by Richard Powers
Novels set in Illinois
DeKalb County, Illinois